Lisa Heller  (born April 16, 2000) is an American singer and songwriter from Simsbury, Connecticut. She achieved global recognition after the release of her song "Hope" along with its video, which after premiering on Twist Magazine trended first on YouTube in Sweden, Canada, Ireland, Finland, Denmark, Australia, and Italy.  Her EP “is anyone listening?” has independently achieved millions of streams and views after its release in 2021.

Early life 
Heller was born in Simsbury, Connecticut, the first daughter of Wendy (Loeb) Heller and David Heller. She has a younger sister (Nicole) and brother (William) who grew up in Simsbury with her. Heller's father is from Westport, Connecticut, and her mother is from West Hartford, Connecticut. She graduated from Simsbury High School.

Career

Early career 
Heller has noted that she frequently wrote songs in her bedroom throughout high school as a relief from her anxiety. While still in high school, Lisa placed in national songwriting competitions. Due to the support from local radio stations and newspapers, she quickly gained a small, local following of fans in and around her hometown in Connecticut. During this time, Heller would frequently be asked to return home to open for touring bands such as American Authors and Rachel Platten at 96.5 TIC Acoustic Cafe's.

Hope, creation of the Hope Wall, Continuation of success  
Heller recorded her debut single "Hope" with producer Jim McGorman at Sunset Sound Factory in Hollywood, California. After returning home, in the weeks leading up to her single, Lisa reached out to a few individuals going through particularly hard times in and around Connecticut. This led to the creation of the "Hope Wall" to which people all over the world have submitted their stories of courage and bravery. The release of her single, "Hope" garnered a video premiere on Twist Magazine. The song has achieved global success, topping the coveted YouTube Trending charts in over 5 countries and independently reaching over 1.5 million views. "Hope" was subsequently featured in the Lifetime Movie The Perfect Mother.

Heller then released follow-up single "Midnight,” which caught the attention of online outlets such as HuffPost, SongFacts and Born Music.

"Light the Fire" was part of the #ICANHELP campaign designed to "educate and empower students to use social media positively."

Ghost, Hope, The Lisa Heller Project 
Heller moved to Los Angeles. Within weeks of arriving, she was approached by a Nashville based music manager and label. This record label helped her put out a slue of releases in the electro-pop genre, including a music video for her song "Ghost". Heller then decided to go a new direction musically, as she stated on her Instagram.

Heller announced that her debut EP would be coming out in 2020. Her first single off of the EP was released on January 3, 2020, and the music video premiered on Popmatters on January 21, 2020.

2021: "Is Anyone Listening?" 
Heller released the first single off of the EP, "Red Flags" (stylized all lowercase) on April 9, 2021, after a clip of the song gained traction on tiktok. She was interviewed in American Songwriter and Atwood Magazine's podcast "Tunes and Tumblers". It is the first single off of her second EP, "is anyone listening?" (stylized all lowercase).

Personal life 
When Heller was in high school, she was diagnosed with vocal cord dysfunction. She noticed when she "was in the middle of running a race and [her] throat started closing up... [she] wasn't sure what was happening, but... couldn't get the air in." She ended up collapsing near the finish line, and her doctors advised her to hum or sing during her races to relax her vocal chords.

Discography

Extended plays

Singles

Filmography

Music videos

Awards and nominations

References

External links 

1996 births
Living people
American child singers
American women pop singers
American women singer-songwriters
American acoustic guitarists
American pop rock singers
American performance artists
American philanthropists
American women pianists
Child pop musicians
American contraltos
American mezzo-sopranos
People from Simsbury, Connecticut
Guitarists from Los Angeles
Guitarists from Connecticut
Guitarists from New York (state)
Singer-songwriters from California
21st-century American businesspeople
21st-century American women guitarists
21st-century American guitarists
21st-century American pianists
21st-century American women singers
21st-century American singers
Singer-songwriters from New York (state)
Singer-songwriters from Connecticut